Jacqueline Susann's Valley of the Dolls is an American television drama miniseries that aired on CBS in October 1981. The first two hours were broadcast on October 19, followed by three hours on October 20 during prime time; CBS originally intended it to last a total of four hours, but requests by the filmmakers for an further hour were granted in September. The teleplay is adapted from the 1966 novel Valley of the Dolls by Jacqueline Susann. The miniseries was directed by Walter Grauman, with Susann's husband Irving Mansfield as executive producer.

Plot

Cast

 Catherine Hicks as Ann Wells
 Lisa Hartman as Neely O'Hara
 Veronica Hamel as Jennifer North
 David Birney as Lyon Burke
 Jean Simmons as Helen Lawson
 James Coburn as Henry Bellamy
 Gary Collins as Kevin Gilmore
 Bert Convy as Tony Polar
 Britt Ekland as Francoise
 Denise Nicholas as Connie
 Steve Inwood as Teddi Casablanca
 Carol Lawrence as Miriam
 Camilla Sparv as Vivienne Moray
 Kathleen Nolan as Dr. Galens
 Tricia O'Neil as Enid Marshall

Reception
The Washington Posts Tom Shales reviewed the miniseries and called it a "leaden and laborious remake" and found the 1967 film to be superior.

References

External links
 
 

1981 television films
1981 films
1980s American television miniseries
1980s American LGBT-related drama television series
Films scored by Fred Karlin
American drama television films
Films directed by Walter Grauman
1980s English-language films